Chysis aurea, the golden-flowered chysis, is an epiphytic species of orchid. It is the type species of the genus Chysis. It is native to Panama, Colombia, and Venezuela.

References

External links 
 
 

aurea
Orchids of Panama
Orchids of Colombia
Orchids of Venezuela
Plants described in 1837